Toshiyasu is a masculine Japanese given name.

Possible writings
Toshiyasu can be written using different combinations of kanji characters. Here are some examples:

敏康, "agile, healthy"
敏安, "agile, peaceful"
敏靖, "agile, peaceful"
敏泰, "agile, peaceful"
敏保, "agile, preserve"
敏易, "agile, divination"
俊康, "talented, healthy"
俊安, "talented, peaceful"
俊靖, "talented, peaceful"
俊泰, "talented, peaceful"
俊保, "talented, preserve"
俊易, "talented, divination"
利康, "benefit, healthy"
利安, "benefit, peaceful"
利靖, "benefit, peaceful"
寿康, "long life, healthy"
寿安, "long life, peaceful"
寿泰, "long life, peaceful"
年康, "year, healthy"
年安, "year, peaceful"
年易, "year, divination"

The name can also be written in hiragana としやす or katakana トシヤス.

Notable people with the name
Toshiyasu Kuriyama (栗山 利安, 1550-1631), Japanese samurai.
Toshiyasu Ishige (石下 年安, born 1932), Japanese sport shooter.
Toshiyasu Takahara (髙原 寿康, born 1980), Japanese footballer.

Japanese masculine given names